Nanhu Township is a township in Yizhou District, Hami, Xinjiang, China. , Nanhu has jurisdiction over 3 pre-township level divisions (villages): Nanhu Village, Toptal Village and Hongshan Village.

References

Hami
Township-level divisions of Xinjiang